Functional connectivity software is used to study functional properties of the connectome using functional Magnetic Resonance Imaging (fMRI) data in the resting state and during tasks. To access many of these software applications visit the NIH funded Neuroimaging Informatics Tools and Resources Clearinghouse (NITRC) site.

See also
 List of neuroimaging software
 Functional connectivity
 Neuroimaging

References

Neuroimaging software
Lists of software